The Butte Creek Formation is a geologic formation in Oregon. It preserves fossils dating back to the Neogene period.

See also 
 List of fossiliferous stratigraphic units in Oregon
 Paleontology in Oregon

References 

Geologic formations of Oregon
Neogene stratigraphic units of North America
Formations